Lapmežciems Parish is an administrative unit of Tukums Municipality, in the Vidzeme region of Latvia.

Towns, villages and settlements of Lapmežciems Parish 
 Lapmežciems
 Bigauņciems
 Ragaciems

External links

Parishes of Latvia
Tukums Municipality
Vidzeme